The Christian F. Uytendale Farmstead is a historic farm in Benson Township, Minnesota, United States.  The property was established as one of the first farms in Swift County, Minnesota, in 1868, by Norwegian immigrant Johannes Torgerson (1823–1909).  In 1879 Torgerson sold it to "Captain" Christian F. Uytendale (1842–1912), a wealthy Danish immigrant who turned the  farm into a prominent local landmark.

In 1887 Uytendale had a new farmhouse built with distinctive Danish architectural features.

The farm was listed on the National Register of Historic Places in 1985 for having local significance in the themes of architecture and exploration/settlement.  The  historic district consists of the 1887 farmhouse, a granary built for Uytendale around 1900, and six early-20th-century outbuildings constructed by later owners.  The farm was nominated for its status as one of Swift County's first farms, its association with one of the county's most famous turn-of-the-20th-century farmers, and its unique ethnically inspired farmhouse.

See also
 National Register of Historic Places listings in Swift County, Minnesota

References

1868 establishments in Minnesota
Buildings and structures in Swift County, Minnesota
Danish-American culture in Minnesota
Farms on the National Register of Historic Places in Minnesota
Historic districts on the National Register of Historic Places in Minnesota
Houses completed in 1887
National Register of Historic Places in Swift County, Minnesota